Planetary Unfolding (1981) is an album of electronic ambient music by composer and keyboardist Michael Stearns. It is considered a classic of ambient music.

Overview
Michael Stearns became a resident composer/musician at Emily Conrad's meditation classes in 1975. He initially composed and performed on a Minimoog and various electro-acoustic instruments. In 1979 he was introduced to the Serge modular synthesizer by Kevin Braheny who owned a 15-panel system (dubbed "The Mighty Serge"), which he used on Morning Jewel. He then built his own 12-panel Serge. With this he performed electronic music that was evocative of space.

Planetary Unfolding was recorded around 1981, when Michael left Conrad's Continuum Studio. The musical ideas that Michael had been performing on the Serge were combined and developed, giving birth to 52 minutes of music divided into two parts, each part featuring three segments.

The album was first released on Stearns' own label, Continuum Montage. It was reissued on CD from 1985 to 1991 by Sonic Atmospheres and is since unavailable: , the cd has not seen reissue on Stearns's 2000-launched label Earth Turtle. However, it is available as a high quality download from Michael Stearns' page https://michaelstearns.bandcamp.com/.

Track listing
 "In the Beginning..." – 8:00
 "Toto, I've a Feeling We're Not in Kansas Anymore!" – 6:20
 "Wherever Two or More Are Gathered" – 9:19
 "Life in the Gravity Well" – 6:55
 "As the Earth Kissed the Moon" – 9:55
 "Something's Moving" – 5:19

References 

Michael Stearns albums
1981 albums
Instrumental albums
Space music albums by American artists